The 2019–20 Big Bash League season or BBL|09 was the ninth season of the Big Bash League, the professional men's Twenty20 domestic cricket competition in Australia. The tournament started on 17 December 2019 and concluded on 8 February 2020.

The length of the season was shortened compared to that from the last year, while the number of matches was increased from 59 to 61 from the previous season. The knock-outs were revamped into a play-off system, with the top two teams in the league getting a second chance to make it to the final even if they lost the first match in the play-offs. The play-off matches were given unique monikers, namely The Eliminator, The Qualifier, The Knock-Out, The Challenger followed by The Final.

The Melbourne Renegades were the defending champions, but finished last in the round-robin group stage. In the final, the Sydney Sixers beat the Melbourne Stars by 19 runs to win the tournament.

Teams

Venues

Points table

Fixtures

Playoffs

The Eliminator

Qualifier

The Knockout

The Challenger

The Final

Teams of the tournament

References

External links
 Official website
 Series home at ESPN Cricinfo

Big Bash League seasons
Big Bash League
Big Bash League